In Greek mythology, Hagno (Ancient Greek: Ἁγνὼ means 'pure, chaste, holy') was the Arcadian nymph who together with other nymphs, Neda, Anthracia, Anchirhoe and Myrtoessa, were nurses of the god Zeus. She was depicted to have a water-pot in one hand and a bowl in the other.

Note

References 

 Pausanias, Description of Greece with an English Translation by W.H.S. Jones, Litt.D., and H.A. Ormerod, M.A., in 4 Volumes. Cambridge, MA, Harvard University Press; London, William Heinemann Ltd. 1918. . Online version at the Perseus Digital Library
 Pausanias, Graeciae Descriptio. 3 vols. Leipzig, Teubner. 1903. Greek text available at the Perseus Digital Library.

Nymphs
Arcadian mythology